Timothy Oulton is a British luxury furniture brand named after its founder and creative director. As of June 2022, it has 55 retail galleries worldwide. Its products are also retailed through Restoration Hardware in the U.S.

History 
Timothy Oulton was born in Manchester, England. Oulton grew up surrounded by antiques at his father's business, Halo Antiques, founded in 1976. From the age of seven to thirteen, Oulton attended the boarding school St Bede's School in Staffordshire, before successfully attaining his Common Entrance exam and going to his Public School Ampleforth College at the age of thirteen. Ampleforth Abby and College is an old Benedictine run school in the North of England, which would later inspire Oulton's signature classic English style. The young Oulton began working for the family business when he left school at 18, and it was here that his passion for furniture and design blossomed.

After years of selling restored homeware items and growing the business with his brother, Oulton officially took the helm at Halo, decided that there was no long-term future in the antiques business, and repositioned the company to focus on the recreation of antique pieces with a modern   viewpoint.

Timothy Oulton passed away on March 4, 2022.

References

External links

 

British furniture designers
Living people
Year of birth missing (living people)